Henry Cousins Chambers (July 26, 1823 – May 1, 1871) was a Confederate politician during the American Civil War.

He was born in Limestone County, Alabama, the son of Henry H. Chambers. He later moved to Mississippi and served in the state legislature in 1859. He represented Mississippi in the First Confederate Congress and the Second Confederate Congress from 1862 to 1865.

He killed his opponent for Confederate Congress, William Augustus Lake, in a duel in 1861.

References
Political Graveyard

1823 births
1871 deaths
People from Limestone County, Alabama
Members of the Confederate House of Representatives from Mississippi
19th-century American politicians
Democratic Party members of the Mississippi House of Representatives
Mississippi lawyers
American duellists
19th-century American lawyers